Ron van Niekerk (Russian: Ван Никерк; born 19 March 1956 in the Netherlands) is a Dutch retired footballer.

References

Living people
1956 births
Dutch footballers
Association football midfielders
HFC Haarlem players
SC Telstar players
Eredivisie players